Div Kola-ye Sofla (also Romanized as Dīv Kolā-ye Soflá and Dīv Kalā-ye Soflá; also known as Dīv Kalā-ye Pā’īn, Dīv Kolā Pā’īn, and Gurakhair) is a village in Nowkand Kola Rural District, in the Central District of Qaem Shahr County, Mazandaran Province, Iran. At the 2006 census, its population was 1,087, in 303 families.

References 

Populated places in Qaem Shahr County